Uddemgadda is one of the old suburbs in Hyderabad, India. It is part of the old city of Hyderabad.

Transport
Uddemgadda is connected by buses run by TSRTC, since a Bus Depot is close by, it is well connected. Buses that run are 89.

There is a MMTS train station is at Uppuguda less than a kilometer away.

Neighbourhoods in Hyderabad, India